The Blade is a  tall, 51-storey residential skyscraper under construction in Manchester, England. The building is part of the second phase of the Crown Street development area at the southern end of Deansgate in the city centre, behind the Deansgate Square skyscraper cluster. It was designed by SimpsonHaugh architects and as of 2023 is the fourth-tallest building in Greater Manchester.

History

Planning
The planning application was submitted to Manchester City Council in April 2020 for two adjacent towers, The Blade and The Cylinder (the latter subsequently renamed Three60), to form the second phase of developer Renaker's Crown Street development, consisting of a combined total of 855 apartments across  of residential space. The Blade contains 414 apartments. The towers are to be connected at the lower levels by a podium containing  of commercial space.

Planning approval was obtained in July 2020.

Construction
Construction of the building commenced in 2021.

See also
List of tallest buildings in the United Kingdom
List of tallest buildings and structures in Greater Manchester

References

Unfinished buildings and structures
Buildings and structures in Manchester
Skyscrapers in Manchester
Residential skyscrapers in England
Apartment buildings in England
Residential buildings in Manchester